Cassese is a surname. Notable people with the surname include:

Andrew Cassese (born 1972), American actor and musician
Antonio Cassese (1937–2011), Italian jurist
Cyril Cassese (born 1972), French footballer
Kevin Cassese (born 1981), American lacrosse player 
Sabino Cassese (born 1935), Italian judge and law professor
Tom Cassese (born 1946), American football player

See also
Joseph Cassese House